Friedrichshafen Ost station is a railway station in the eastern part of the town of Friedrichshafen, located in the Bodenseekreis district in Baden-Württemberg, Germany.

References

External links

Ost
Buildings and structures in Bodenseekreis
Friedrichshafen